Oluf A. Saugestad (January 19, 1840 - December 17, 1926) was a member of the Wisconsin State Assembly.

Biography
Saugestad was born in Beitstad in Nord-Trøndelag, Norway. In 1864, he graduated from the Veterinary College in Copenhagen, Denmark. On June 29, 1870, he married Karen E. Gravorok. They later had a daughter. Saugestad settled in the village of Baldwin in St. Croix County, Wisconsin during 1872. He initially followed the profession of veterinary surgeon. He also served as vice president of the Bank of Baldwin. He died at the age of 88 in Melrude, St. Louis County, Minnesota.

Political career
Saugestad was elected a member of the Wisconsin State Assembly in 1882. He was an Independent Republican. Other public positions he held include Town Treasurer of Baldwin from 1876 to 1882 and Sheriff of St. Croix County, Wisconsin from 1893 to 1894.

References

External links

Wisconsin Historical Society

Politicians from Nord-Trøndelag
Norwegian emigrants to the United States
People from Steinkjer
People from Baldwin, Wisconsin
Republican Party members of the Wisconsin State Assembly
City and town treasurers in the United States
Wisconsin sheriffs
American Lutherans
1840 births
1926 deaths
Burials in Wisconsin